Gliese 402 is a star located 22.7 light years from the Solar System. Located in the constellation of Leo, it is also known as Wolf 358 from its entry in Max Wolf's star catalogue. The stars nearest to Gliese 402 are Gliese 393, at 3.43 light years, Gliese 408, at 6.26 light years, and Gliese 382 at 6.66 light years.

Gliese 402 is a BY Draconis variable, with its apparent magnitude varying between 11.64 and 11.70.  The brightness changes are due to starspots and chromospheric activity combined with the rotation of the star.  It has been given the variable star designation EE Leonis.

Like the vast majority of stars in the Solar neighborhood, Gliese 402 is a dim red dwarf. With an apparent magnitude +11.66, it is far too dim to be seen with the naked eye; it can only be seen with a telescope. Its luminosity is only 0.091% that of the Sun. Its spectral type is M4V (sometimes cited as M5V) and its effective temperature is about 3100 K. Its physical characteristics are quite similar to those of Ross 128 or Kruger 60 B, with a radius of about 30% of the Sun. Its projected rotation speed is at most 2.3 km/s or less, while its metallicity is slightly lower than that of the Sun.

References

M-type main-sequence stars
0402
Leonis, EE
053020
0358
Leo (constellation)